Trinet can mean:
TRINet (India coast), formerly "Tsunami Rehab Information Network", also "The Resource and Information Network: for the coast"
TriNet, a consultancy firm in San Leandro, California, USA